Murder Inc. Records, LLC. (formerly The Inc. Records) is an American record label founded by brothers Chris and Irv Gotti in 1998. The label's flagship artist was Ja Rule. According to Chris Gotti, Murder Inc. had sold over 30 million units worldwide and grossed over $500 million.

History

Formation and success (1999–2003)
After helping Def Jam with the success of DMX, Jay-Z, and Ja Rule, Russell Simmons gave Irv Gotti his own label under Def Jam. While watching Biography on A&E during gangster week, a Murder, Inc. logo appeared on the screen, inspiring Irv to name his label after the organized crime group, paralleling his desire to put out hit records to the crime group's purpose of putting out contract hits. Murder Inc.'s first set of artists were Ja Rule, Black Child, Tah Murdah and Nemesis. On June 1, 1999, Murder Inc. released its first studio album, Venni Vetti Vecci by Ja Rule. Featuring production from Irv Gotti (who also executive produced the album) as well as guest appearances from Murder Inc. artists Tah Murdah, Black Child and Nemesis in their debut major appearances, the album featured the hit single "Holla Holla" and soon was certified Platinum in the U.S., which made Ja Rule and Murder Inc. among the most popular artists and labels in the industry, respectively.

On October 10, 2000, Ja Rule released his second studio album, Rule 3:36. The album featured Ja Rule and Murder Inc.'s first top 15 hit with Between Me and You and also featured appearances from Tah Murdah, Black Child, and Murder Inc.'s first female artist Vita. The album debuted and peaked at number 1 on the Billboard top 200, and would ultimately be certified Triple Platinum by the RIAA. That same year, Irv Gotti released the first Murder Inc. compilation, Irv Gotti Presents: The Murderers. Released to capitalize off of Ja Rule's success, the album showcased Murder Inc. artists and affiliates Black Child, Tah Murdah, Ja Rule, Ronnie Bumps, Vita, and O-1.

Murder Inc. signed Charli Baltimore and Ashanti in 2001. The label reached its peak of success from mid-2001 to early 2003. Ja Rule's release of his multi-platinum selling album Pain Is Love was soon followed by Ashanti's multi-platinum selling debut, Ashanti, which spawned three hit singles on the Billboard charts.

On July 2, 2002, Murder Inc. released the compilation, Irv Gotti Presents: The Inc. The album continued to showcase original artists like Ja Rule, Black Child, Vita and Caddillac Tah, while showcasing new artists like Ashanti and Charli Baltimore and Murder Inc. affiliates like D.O. Cannon, Jody Mack, O-1, Ronnie Bumps and Young Merc. Murder Inc. scored another hit single with Down 4 U, and the album peaked in the top 3 on the Billboard top 200 and was ultimately certified Gold by the RIAA. That same month, Vita severed ties with Murder Inc.  Vita's debut album on Murder Inc., La Dolce Vita, was originally scheduled to be released in Fall 2002. However, the album was ultimately shelved. During this time, Murder Inc. started associating with Nas as he collaborated with Ja Rule and Ashanti for the remix to "The Pledge". Although it was speculated that Nas would possibly sign to Murder Inc., the deal never materialized.  Ja Rule's next album (The Last Temptation) went Platinum in the U.S. Caddillac Tah's debut album, Pov City Hustla, was originally scheduled to be released through Murder Inc. Records. However, the album was ultimately shelved. Other albums intended to be released though Murder Inc. but ultimately shelved also include Black Child's debut album, Ronnie Bumps' debut album, and a D.O. Cannon and Young Merc collaboration album. All three albums were originally scheduled for a 2003 release.

On January 3, 2003, Murder Inc.'s office was raided by federal agents trying to find evidence that Murder Inc. was funneling and laundering drug money for Kenneth "Supreme" McGriff. Another setback the label suffered was its core artist Ja Rule participating in a feud with rapper 50 Cent which had been occupant since 1999. Blood in My Eye, Ja's fifth studio album, released in November 2003, included diss tracks aimed at 50 and G-Unit, as well as Eminem. The album didn't live up to any commercial success. Three months earlier, Ashanti obtained more success on her own with a second studio album, Chapter II, becoming her second number one album in her career. Charli Baltimore, however, didn't have any time to release an album under the label, causing her to leave in October 2003.

Murder Inc. and TVT Records were also blocked by Universal from releasing a Cash Money Click reunion album featuring Ja Rule, due to his contractual obligations. Def Jam was ordered to pay TVT $132 million in punitive damages in 2003. However, Def Jam won an appeal and instead only paid TVT $126,720. The Cash Money Click reunion album, scheduled for a November 2002 release through Murder Inc., was ultimately shelved.

The Inc. rebrand (2003–2008) 
On December 4, 2003, during a press conference, Irv Gotti announced that in light of the recent changes, setbacks, and controversies surrounding the label, Murder Inc. would be renamed to The Inc. In 2004, Lloyd was signed and released his debut album Southside. Ja Rule would see his music return to form, with his Gold RIAA-selling sixth studio album R.U.L.E., while Ashanti would also release her fourth studio album, Concrete Rose, neither of which were as successful as both artists' previous works. At the end of 2004, they were ordered to leave Def Jam offices while the investigations were on. When the trials began in early 2005, Def Jam made them honor their contracts and release compilation albums; then they were not re-signed.

Murder Inc. spent 2005 and part of 2006 searching for distribution. In August 2006, Irv Gotti and The Inc. signed to Universal Motown and soon began releasing music.    After settling in at Universal Motown, Irv Gotti signed Vanessa Carlton that year.

Decline (2007–2012)
On August 1, 2007, Ja Rule would return to radio and television on Sucker Free on MTV, where he debuted his single "Uh-Ohhh!!" with Lil Wayne and his return to recording music. Irv Gotti and Eastwood created Murder Inc. West with Eastwood serving as its president and Gotti on A&R. Techniec also signed to the label and was appointed vice president. Techniec's group Dynamic Certified also signed to the label. Irv Gotti later gave Ja Rule his own label, MPire.

In May 2009, Irv Gotti announced to MTV that he was releasing Ashanti from her contract with Murder Inc. A month later Lloyd—who had been with Murder Inc. for 5 years—asked to be released from his contract. Lloyd cited the need for more control and change as reasons for his departure from the slowly shrinking label. "I'm ready for a change. There's no bad blood. I just feel I need to take more control over my career and get a fresh start. Hopefully Irv can understand my position," Lloyd explained in a press release.

"We find ourselves in limbo for the second time in three years," Henry 'Noonie' Lee, Lloyd's manager said in a statement. "It's frustrating to know that opportunities to advance Lloyd's career are out there but we can't exploit them due to our current situation. Even though Lloyd is appreciative of the opportunity that has been afforded him by Murder Inc., he feels it's time for him to move on and seek opportunities that will allow him to build and enhance his brand."

That same year, Ja Rule announced that he was no longer signed to Murder Inc. as well, the same label he had been with since its beginnings in 1997. Ja Rule decided to go independent on his own label, Mpire, which is distributed through Fontana. Although Ja Rule had departed from Murder Inc., he revealed he was still on great terms with Irv Gotti and the two worked together for Ja Rule's next album, Pain Is Love 2. Baltimore soon left the label in 2010 for new opportunities.

Partnership deals (2013–2017)
In September 2013, Murder Inc. was relaunched as an umbrella label under Irv Gotti's new label, Visionary. On September 27, Murder Inc. released its first songs in years, Ja Rule's "Fresh Out da Pen" and "Everything", both produced by Murder Inc./Visionary producers Reefa and Myles William.

In June 2017, it was announced that Murder Inc. had partnered with 300.

Legal issues

On Friday, January 3, 2003, federal agents and New York Police Department investigators raided the headquarters of Murder Inc. Records, located at One Worldwide Plaza in Midtown Manhattan. The raid was a part of a yearlong investigation into the connection between The Lorenzo brothers and American drug lord Kenneth “Supreme” McGriff. Investigators believed that the Lorenzos launched Murder Inc. Records using money bankrolled by McGriff to launder McGriff’s drug money, as well as help McGriff launder drug money through the making of the 2003 film Crime Partners. Although computers and documents were seized, no charges were immediately filed, and no arrests were immediately made. The raid was dramatized in the music video for Ja Rule’s Murder Reigns. 

Chris and Irv Gotti’s history with McGriff dates back to 1994, when McGriff, newly paroled from prison, met Chris and Irv on the set of a music video in Queens, New York. McGriff wanted to go into cinematography and sought help from Chris and Irv Gotti to produce and direct a film based on Donald Goines’ Kenyatta series’ novel Crime Partners. The Lorenzos since then maintained a friendship with McGriff, having him appear in the music video for Ja Rule’s 1999 single “Murda 4 Life” and helped financed McGriff’s dream project, Crime Partners, around 2000.  

On January 25, 2005, Chris and Irv Gotti surrendered to authorities in New York City and were officially charged with money laundering and conspiracy to launder money. During the trial, Irv Gotti was represented by Gerald B. Lefcourt, and Chris Gotti was represented by Gerald Shargel. In December 2005, Chris and Irv Gotti were found not guilty of money laundering and conspiracy to launder money.

Artists
 Ashanti 
 Black Child 
 Charli Baltimore 
 Ja Rule 
 Lloyd
 Vita

Releases

See also
 List of record labels
 List of artists signed to The Inc. Records

References

External links
 Official fansite

Record labels established in 1998

Labels distributed by Universal Music Group
New York (state) record labels
American hip hop record labels
Contemporary R&B record labels
Gangsta rap record labels